Jarvis Lake is a lake in Berrien County, in the U.S. state of Michigan.

Jarvis Lake has the name of one B. Jarvis, the original owner of the site.

References

Lakes of Berrien County, Michigan